Bethel Bible College (BBC) is an ecumenical theological seminary located in Guntur in Andhra Pradesh in India. It was founded in 2000 November 4 and is affiliated to the Senate of Serampore College (University), Serampore, West Bengal.

The Gospel Mission of India founded the college for ensuring adequate spiritual formation for priests. The college offers Bachelor of Divinity degrees.

References

Christian seminaries and theological colleges in India
Reformed church seminaries and theological colleges
Colleges in Guntur
Educational institutions established in 2000
2000 establishments in Andhra Pradesh
Seminaries and theological colleges affiliated to the Senate of Serampore College (University)